Buckenbowra River, a perennial river of the Clyde River catchment, is located in the upper ranges of the South Coast region of New South Wales, Australia.

Course and features
The river descends  over its  course.

History
The traditional custodians of the land surrounding Buckenbowra River are the Indigenous Australian people of the Walbanja clan.

European settlement occurred in the 1830s when a horse trail was established running beside the waterway. In the 1850s this rough track was replaced with a convict-built road, supported in cuttings by dry stone walls. The road was abandoned during the nineteenth century, with one forgotten  section rediscovered in 2005.

Flora and fauna
The gorges through which the Buckenbowra River flows are dominated by stands of casuarina trees. Mangroves are endemic along the river banks, providing the only recorded habitat for the lichen Pertusaria melaleucoides.

Fish species include Australian grayling and Australian bass.

See also

 Budawang Range
 Corn Trail
 Deua National Park
 Rivers of New South Wales
 List of rivers of New South Wales (A–K)
 List of rivers of Australia

References

 

Rivers of New South Wales
South Coast (New South Wales)
Eurobodalla Shire